"Let It Rain" is a song by British recording artist Eliza Doolittle. The song was released as a digital download in the United Kingdom on 11 October 2013 as the second single from her second studio album, In Your Hands (2013). The song has peaked to number 55 on the UK Singles Chart.

Music video
A music video to accompany the release of "Let It Rain" was first released onto YouTube on 1 September 2013 at a total length of four minutes and twenty-one seconds.

Track listing

Chart performance

Weekly charts

Release history

References

2013 songs
Eliza Doolittle (singer) songs
Parlophone singles
2013 singles
Songs written by Eliza Doolittle (singer)
Songs written by Ross Golan
Songs written by Oren Yoel
Songs written by Steve Robson